Morduq (also known as Mordaq and Murdi) is a village in Sarajuy-ye Shomali Rural District, in the Central District of Maragheh County, East Azerbaijan Province, Iran. At the 2006 census, its population was 808, in 173 families.

References 

Towns and villages in Maragheh County